is a railway station in  the city of Ōmachi, Nagano, Japan, operated by East Japan Railway Company (JR East).

Lines
Yanaba Station is served by the Ōito Line and is 46.3 kilometers from the terminus of the line at Matsumoto Station.

Station layout
The station consists of two ground-level opposed side platforms connected by a footbridge. The station is unattended.

Platforms

History
Yanaba Station opened on 25 September 1929. With the privatization of Japanese National Railways (JNR) on 1 April 1987, the station came under the control of JR East.

Surrounding area

See also
 List of railway stations in Japan

References

External links

 JR East station information 

Railway stations in Nagano Prefecture
Ōito Line
Railway stations in Japan opened in 1929
Stations of East Japan Railway Company
Ōmachi, Nagano